Juan Ezequiel García (born 9 October 1991) is an Argentine footballer who plays as a central midfielder.

Career
García played for Banfield between 2011 and 2015. He first appeared on a teamsheet for Banfield on 30 November 2011, as an unused substitute in a Copa Argentina match against Atlético Paraná. His professional debut came just over a year later in a Primera B Nacional win against Crucero del Norte. Twelve further appearances followed across 2012–13, 2013–14 and 2014, with the last four coming in the Argentine Primera División. In November 2015, García left Argentine football to join Lega Pro side Fidelis Andria of Italian football. His debut came on 12 December versus Casertana. He left in July 2016 after just three appearances.

In late 2016, García had a short spell with Dro of Serie D. He made seven appearances prior to departing. He had trials with Alessandria and Reggina in August 2017. In July 2018, following a trial period, Santamarina signed García. Despite being on the substitutes bench for fixtures with Instituto and Temperley, García didn't play a competitive, senior game for Santamarina. García subsequently departed his homeland again in January 2019, completing a move to Atlético Porteño of the Ecuadorian Serie B. He left at the end of the year, after twenty-seven appearances in all competitions.

In August 2020, García headed to Wales with Cymru North team Bangor City. His debut arrived, belatedly due to the COVID-19 pandemic, on 12 December in a League Cup victory over Gresford Athletic.

Career statistics
.

Honours
Banfield
Primera B Nacional: 2013–14

References

External links

1991 births
Living people
People from Lomas de Zamora
Argentine footballers
Association football midfielders
Argentine expatriate footballers
Argentine expatriate sportspeople in Italy
Argentine expatriate sportspeople in Ecuador
Argentine expatriate sportspeople in Wales
Expatriate footballers in Italy
Expatriate footballers in Ecuador
Expatriate footballers in Wales
Primera Nacional players
Argentine Primera División players
Serie C players
Serie D players
Ecuadorian Serie B players
Club Atlético Banfield footballers
S.S. Fidelis Andria 1928 players
U.S. Dro players
Club y Biblioteca Ramón Santamarina footballers
Bangor City F.C. players
Sportspeople from Buenos Aires Province